The Vestri men's basketball team, commonly known as Vestri, is a basketball team based in Ísafjörður, Iceland. The club was founded in 1965 as Körfuknattleiksfélag Ísafjarðar and held that name until it merged with newly founded Íþróttafélagið Vestri multi-sport club in 2016 and became its basketball department.

History
The club was founded in 1965 as Körfuknattleiksfélag Ísafjarðar (KFÍ).

In March 1983, KFÍ finished first in its group in 2. deild karla and played Laugdælir, Breiðablik and Íþróttafélag Menntaskólans á Egilsstöðum (ÍME) in they playoffs for the 2. deild championship and promotion to 1. deild karla. According to the rules at the time, each team would play the other three once and the team with the best win–loss record would be crowned champions. KFÍ lost its first game to Breiðablik, 79–76, despite 29 points from Guðjón Már Þorsteinsson and 21 points from Jón Oddsson. In the second game, against Laugdælir, KFÍ scored the last 4 points of the game, winning 79–76, with Kristinn Kristjánsson scoring 23 points, Jón Oddsson 17 points and Guðjón Már Þorsteinsson 16 points. In the final game, KFÍ defeated ÍME 91–70. Both Breiðablik and Laugdælir also won two out of three games, tied with KFÍ. As the rules did not count for any tie-breakers, the three teams were slated to meet again to decide the winner. During the second try, KFÍ lost to Breiðablik in the first game, 78–77, but won Laugdælir in the second game 79–76. Laugdælir however won Breiðablik leaving the teams again tied, thus meaning that a third playoff would be held to decide the winner. During the third playoff, KFÍ won Breiðablik but lost to Laugdælir. As Breiðablik won Laugdælir the teams were once again tied. Prior to the fourth playoffs, the Icelandic Basketball Federation decided that if the teams would once again finish tied, the team with the best scoring record would finish first. The fourth playoff was held from 30 April to 2 May and there Laugdælir won both KFÍ and Breiðablik convincingly and were crowned 2. deild karla champions.

In 1994, the team won the 2. deild karla playoffs, which was held jointly in Ísafjörður and Bolungarvík, after defeating Þór Þorlákshöfn 75–48, and was promoted to 1. deild karla.

On 17 October 1999, KFÍ won Skallagrímur, 129–132, in a game that went into four overtimes. It was the longest Úrvalsdeild karla game ever played in Iceland. Clifton Bush set a then record by playing 59 minutes in the game. It has since been broken by Hörður Axel Vilhjálmsson.

In 2016, KFÍ merged into Íþróttafélagið Vestri and became its basketball sub-division.

On 16 December 2018, while playing in the second-tier 1. deild karla, it knocked out top-tier Haukar in the Final 16 of the Icelandic Cup. It was the only team outside the top-tier Úrvalsdeild to appear in the Final 8 of the cup.

In June 2021, Vestri defeated Hamar in the 1. deild promotion finals and achieved promotion to the Úrvalsdeild.

Head coaches
Men's head coaches:

Ingvar Sigurbjörnsson 1982–1983
Geir Þorsteinsson 1993–1995
Guðjón Már Þorsteinsson 1995–1996
Guðni Ólafur Guðnason 1996–1998
Tony Garbelotto 1998–2000
Karl Jónsson 2000–2001
Hrafn Kristjánsson 2001–2004
Baldur Ingi Jónasson 2001–2002, 2004–2006
Borce Ilievski 2006–2010
B.J. Aldridge 2010
Neil Shiran Þórisson 2010–2011
Pétur Már Sigurðsson 2011–2013
Birgir Örn Birgisson 2013–2016
Neil Shiran Þórisson and Guðni Ólafur Guðnason 2016
Yngvi Gunnlaugsson 2016–2019
Pétur Már Sigurðsson 2019–present

Season by season

Notes
1With two games left, the team had already secured the 3rd seed in the promotion playoffs when the rest of the season and playoffs was canceled.

Trophies and awards

Trophies
Icelandic Men's Division I:
 Winners (4): 1996, 2003, 2010, 2012 
Icelandic Men's Division II:
 Winners (3): 1975, 1980, 1994 
Icelandic Men's Basketball Cup:
 Runners-up (1): 1998

Awards

Úrvalsdeild Men's Domestic All-First Team
Friðrik Erlendur Stefánsson – 1998
Úrvalsdeild Men's Young Player of the Year
Friðrik Erlendur Stefánsson – 1997
Úrvalsdeild Men's Foreign Player of the Year
David Bevis – 1998
Joshua Helm – 2005

Notable players

Records (Úrvalsdeild karla only)

Points
Career: Baldur Ingi Jónasson, 1.459
Career average: Joshua Helm, 37.2
3 pointers
Career: Baldur Ingi Jónasson, 361
Rebounds
Career: Friðrik Erlendur Stefánsson, 505
Career average: Joshua Helm, 14.0
Assists
Career: Baldur Ingi Jónasson, 277
Career average: Bethuel Fletcher, 7.7
Steals
Career: Baldur Ingi Jónasson, 188
Career average: Clifton Bush, 2.8
Blocks
Career: Friðrik Erlendur Stefánsson, 51
Career average: Troy Wiley, 4.4
Games
Career: Baldur Ingi Jónasson, 151
Single season records
Points: Joshua Helm, 819
Points per game: Joshua Helm, 37.2
3 pointers: Baldur Ingi Jónasson, 63
Rebounds: Joshua Helm, 309
Rebounds per game: Joshua Helm, 14.0
Assists: Tom Hull, 118
Assists per game: Bethuel Fletcher, 7.7
Steals: Ólafur Jón Ormsson, 66
Steals per game: Ólafur Jón Ormsson, 3.5
Blocks: Troy Wiley, 44
Blocks per game: Troy Wiley, 4.4
Single game records
Points: Clifton Bush, 55
3 pointers: Adam Spanich, 9
Rebounds: Friðrik Erlendur Stefánsson, James Cason, 24
Assists: Marcos Salas, Bethuel Fletcher, 12
Steals: Craig Schoen, 9
Blocks: Sigurður Gunnar Þorsteinsson, 8

Reserve team
Vestri has a men's reserve team that plays in the amateur level Icelandic 4th-tier 3. deild karla, called Vestri-b and nicknamed Flaggskipið (English: The Flagship). In 2018 it was the runner-up to the 3. deild championship.

Season by season

References

Basketball teams in Iceland
Basketball teams established in 1965
Íþróttafélagið Vestri